Admetella is a genus of marine annelids in the family Polynoidae (scale worms). Species of Admetella, although uncommonly collected are nevertheless known from widespread localities in the Indian, Pacific and Atlantic Oceans at depths of 400–6,000 m.

Description 

Species of Admetella have a short triangular sheath-like appendage at the base of the lateral antennae and have 50 or more segments and 25 to 31 pairs of elytra. Notochaetae and neurochaetae are long, slender and are distally flattened.

Species 
Three valid species of Admetella are known as of July 2020:

Admetella brevis Levenstein, 1978
Admetella hastigerens Chamberlin, 1919
Admetella longipedata (McIntosh, 1885)

References 

Phyllodocida
Polychaete genera